

Union Councils
AHMAD MOHANA
ALLUDAY WALI
BASIRA
BASTI KHARAK
BERAHIM WALI
CHAK FARAZI
DANREEN
GAIRAY WAHIN
GANGA
GHAZANFAR GARH
GULL WALA
JAGAT PUR
KARAM DAD QURESHI
KHANPUR NORTH
KHANGARH
LUTKERAN
M. GARH CITY-1
M. GARH CITY-2
M. GARH CITY-3
M. GARH CITY-4
MAHRA EAST
MANAK PUR
MURAD ABAD
NOHAN WALI
PATTAL MUNDA
RANG PUR
ROHILLAN WALI
SHAH JAMAL
SHARIF CHAJRA
TALIRI
THATHA QURESHI
UMAR PUR SOUTH
USMAN KORIA
UTRA SANDILA
WAN PITAFI
Hassan pur tarund

References

Muzaffargarh District
Tehsils of Punjab, Pakistan